Waitoa is a settlement in the Matamata-Piako District of New Zealand. State Highway 26 runs through the town, and connects to Te Aroha 10 km to the north-east.

A Fonterra dairy factory is a prominent blue building in the middle of the town.

The Waitoa River runs through the village and is prone to flooding.

A railway line runs to the dairy factory, and used to go to Te Aroha, however this section was closed and the line only runs to service the dairy factory.

Two freezing works and a rendering plant also operate in the Waitoa area. Workers commute from nearby towns of Te Aroha, Morrinsville and Matamata.

Demographics
Waitoa is part of the larger Waitoa-Ngarua statistical area.

Waitoa had a population of 291 at the 2018 New Zealand census, an increase of 6 people (2.1%) since the 2013 census, and unchanged since the 2006 census. There were 114 households, comprising 144 males and 150 females, giving a sex ratio of 0.96 males per female, with 60 people (20.6%) aged under 15 years, 60 (20.6%) aged 15 to 29, 135 (46.4%) aged 30 to 64, and 42 (14.4%) aged 65 or older.

Ethnicities were 83.5% European/Pākehā, 24.7% Māori, 4.1% Pacific peoples, and 3.1% Asian. People may identify with more than one ethnicity.

Although some people chose not to answer the census's question about religious affiliation, 54.6% had no religion, 30.9% were Christian, 4.1% had Māori religious beliefs, 1.0% were Hindu, 1.0% were Muslim and 1.0% had other religions.

Of those at least 15 years old, 12 (5.2%) people had a bachelor's or higher degree, and 72 (31.2%) people had no formal qualifications. 33 people (14.3%) earned over $70,000 compared to 17.2% nationally. The employment status of those at least 15 was that 105 (45.5%) people were employed full-time, 33 (14.3%) were part-time, and 9 (3.9%) were unemployed.

Waitoa-Ngarua statistical area

Waitoa-Ngarua had a population of 1,170 at the 2018 New Zealand census, an increase of 18 people (1.6%) since the 2013 census, and a decrease of 126 people (−9.7%) since the 2006 census. There were 432 households, comprising 615 males and 555 females, giving a sex ratio of 1.11 males per female. The median age was 35.9 years (compared with 37.4 years nationally), with 255 people (21.8%) aged under 15 years, 231 (19.7%) aged 15 to 29, 552 (47.2%) aged 30 to 64, and 135 (11.5%) aged 65 or older.

Ethnicities were 79.2% European/Pākehā, 13.3% Māori, 3.1% Pacific peoples, 9.7% Asian, and 3.3% other ethnicities. People may identify with more than one ethnicity.

The percentage of people born overseas was 16.9, compared with 27.1% nationally.

Although some people chose not to answer the census's question about religious affiliation, 52.3% had no religion, 33.6% were Christian, 1.0% had Māori religious beliefs, 2.6% were Hindu, 0.3% were Muslim, 0.5% were Buddhist and 2.1% had other religions.

Of those at least 15 years old, 96 (10.5%) people had a bachelor's or higher degree, and 240 (26.2%) people had no formal qualifications. The median income was $37,500, compared with $31,800 nationally. 171 people (18.7%) earned over $70,000 compared to 17.2% nationally. The employment status of those at least 15 was that 498 (54.4%) people were employed full-time, 135 (14.8%) were part-time, and 36 (3.9%) were unemployed.

Education
Waitoa had a primary school between 1904 and 2015. It opened as Waitoa Valley School and reached a roll of 222 students in 1959. The roll fell subsequently, and there were 18 students in the final year.

References

Populated places in Waikato
Matamata-Piako District